John Mendelsohn may refer to:

 John Mendelsohn (doctor) (1936–2019), American cancer researcher
 John Mendelsohn (musician) (born 1947), American writer, journalist, musician and graphic designer

See also 
 Jonathan Mendelsohn, Baron Mendelsohn (born 1966), British lobbyist and Labour political organiser
 Jonathan Mendelsohn (singer) (born 1980), American singer
 John Mendelson (1917–1978), British Labour Party politician